The Sunburst Award for Canadian Literature of the Fantastic is an annual award given for a speculative fiction novel or a book-length collection.

History
The name of the award comes from the title of the first novel by Phyllis Gotlieb, Sunburst (1964).

The first award was given out in 2001. The award consists of a cash prize ($1,000 Canadian for novel length work, and $500 Canadian for short stories) and a medallion.  The winner is selected by jury; a new jury is struck each year.

On June 2, 2020, the Sunburst award society announced the awards were going on a hiatus due to impacts related to COVID-19.

List of past award winners

Lists of nominees
For a complete and up to date listing of current and past long-listed and short-listed works, please see the Sunburst Award Website.

Eligibility
The Sunburst Award administration and juries use the broadest possible definition of speculative fiction for eligibility purposes: "science fiction, fantasy, magic realism, horror, surrealism, fantastique, fabulism, myth and legend, fantastical storytelling, and any other writing beyond the strictly realistic". To be eligible for the award, a work must be published between January 1 and December 31 of the previous year. Only Canadian citizens and landed immigrants are eligible.

References

External links
Sunburst Award Web Site

Awards established in 2001
Canadian science fiction awards